The Men's 5000 metres competition at the 2020 World Single Distances Speed Skating Championships was held on February 13, 2020.

Results
The race was started at 13:40.

References

Men's 5000 metres